Nikos Samaras (1 July 1970 – 4 January 2013) was a Greek volleyball player, who competed for various Greek, Italian, Spanish and Turkish clubs.

Samaras was born in Stuttgart. He led Orestiada, helping the team to become successful in Greece and Europe. Many young people turned to volleyball in the 1990s because of him.

Career stats 

 160 caps with the Greece Junior National Team
 263 caps with the Greece National Team

Honours

National team
 1989 Junior World Championship - 6th place
 1994 FIVB World Championship - 6th place

Clubs
 1993 Greek Cup -  Runner-up, with Orestiada
 1993 Greek Championship -  Runner-up, with Orestiada
 1995 CEV Cup -  Runner-up, with Orestiada
 1997 Greek Championship -  Runner-up, with Orestiada
 1998 Greek Championship -  Runner-up, with Orestiada
 2000 Greek Cup -  Champion, with Iraklis Thessaloniki
 2004 Turkish Championship -  Runner-up, with Fenerbahçe

Death 
Samaras died on Friday 4 January 2013, aged 42, after suffering a brain aneurysm.

References 

1970 births
2013 deaths
Panathinaikos V.C. players
Iraklis V.C. players
A.C. Orestias players
Fenerbahçe volleyballers
Greek men's volleyball players
Sportspeople from Stuttgart
Volleyball players from Orestiada